Judgement (Korean 'Simpan' 심|판 hangul, 審|判 hanja) is a 1999 short film by South Korean director Park Chan-wook based on the 1995 collapse of the Sampoong Department store.

Synopsis
In a morgue lies the lifeless body of a girl, waiting to be identified. The girl was killed in the collapse of the Sampoong Department store and a wrongful death settlement has been offered to her family. The girl's body is claimed both by a middle-aged couple, who say she is their runaway daughter, and by one of the morgue employees, whose daughter disappeared seven years ago. The story is interspersed with documentary footage from various disasters.

Cast
 Gi Ju-bong as Funeral director
 Koh In-bae as Husband
 Kwon Nam-hee as Wife
 Park Ji-il as Public servant
 Choi Hak-rak as TV correspondent
 Myeong Ji-yeon as Daughter
 Lee Jong-yong as Cameraman
 Kim Tae-ryong as Girl in the photo

Reception
Another Mag praised the camera work and use of color in a mostly black-and-white film, noting how it foreshadows the stylistic hallmarks Park developed in later projects. The blog Film School Rejects described it as "a miniature triumph of genre blending", comparing it to both film noir and Korean soap opera.

References

External links
 
 
 Judgement at parkchanwook.org

1999 films
1999 drama films
South Korean drama films
South Korean short films
Films directed by Park Chan-wook
1990s Korean-language films
1999 short films